Andriy Mykhailovych Herus (born March 18, 1982, in the city of Novovolynsk, Volyn Oblast, Ukraine) is a Ukrainian civil servant and politician. Representative of President Zelensky in the Cabinet of Ministers of Ukraine (from May 22 to November 11, 2019).

People's Deputy of Ukraine of the 9th convocation.

Biography 
He was born into a mining family. He graduated from the Faculty of Economics of Lviv University (majoring in Economic Cybernetics), received an MBA from the Grenoble School of Business (London).

2003–2007 — investment analyst, director of trade and investment activities at Galnaftogaz. From 2007 to 2014 - Director of Investment Activities Concorde Capital. Since 2015 - Executive Director of Concorde Capital.

2014-2015 - Member of the National Regulatory Commission for Energy and Utilities (NCRECP).

Political activity 
2015 - candidate for Kyiv City Council from the Samopomich party. Since 2017 - Chairman of the NGO "Association of Energy Consumers and Utilities". He was one of the main critics of the fuel pricing formula "Rotterdam Plus".

Member of the team of 2019 presidential candidate Zelensky. Candidate for People's Deputies from the Servant of People Party in the 2019 parliamentary elections, No. 17 on the list. Lives in Kiev.

References 

1982 births
Living people
People from Novovolynsk
University of Lviv alumni
Ninth convocation members of the Verkhovna Rada
Servant of the People (political party) politicians